Lieutenant-Colonel Charles Ruthven Bickerton Blackburn  (7 May 1913 – 12 April 2016) was a professor of medicine at the University of Sydney.

His father was Lieutenant-Colonel Sir Charles Bickerton Blackburn KCMG, OBE (22 April 1874 – 20 July 1972), an Australian university chancellor and physician.

During World War II Ruthven was Commanding and Senior Physician of the Land Headquarters Medical Research Unit (LHQ, 1MRU), Australian Army Medical Corps (AAMC).

In 1940 he married Nell. (Eleanor Freeman 1916–1967.)  They had two daughters, Susan Ann and Sandra.

In 1968 he married colleague and distinguished asthma researcher Professor Ann Woolcock AO FAA FRACP (1937–2001). The couple raised two sons, Simon and Angus.

In 2006 he was appointed a Companion of the Order of Australia (AC) in recognition of his service to the development of academic medicine and medical education in Australia.

He died on 12 April 2016, just short of his 103rd birthday.

References

Australian medical researchers
1913 births
2016 deaths
Australian centenarians
Companions of the Order of Australia
Men centenarians
Academic staff of the University of Sydney
University of Sydney alumni